Anton Kriel (born 11 September 1964) is a South African badminton player. He competed in two events at the 1992 Summer Olympics.

References

1964 births
Living people
South African male badminton players
Olympic badminton players of South Africa
Badminton players at the 1992 Summer Olympics
Place of birth missing (living people)